Live Oak may refer to:

The live oak, any of several types of oak trees that have evergreen foliage.

Localities in the United States
 Live Oak, Santa Cruz County, California, a census-designated place
 Live Oak, Sutter County, California, an incorporated city
 Live Oak, Florida, an incorporated city
 Live Oak (Weyanoke, Louisiana), plantation house and site listed on the NRHP in Louisiana
 Live Oak, South Carolina, a census-designated place
 Live Oak, Texas, an incorporated city
 Live Oak County, Texas

High schools in the United States
Live Oak High School (Morgan Hill, California)
Live Oak High School (Louisiana), in Watson

Other
 Live Oak Brewing Company, a craft brewery located in Austin, Texas
 LIVE OAK (planning group), the code name for a military planning group during the Cold War